Eliachna chileana is a species of moth of the family Tortricidae. It is found in Chile in the provinces of Talca, Curicó, Cautín, Malleco and Ñuble.

The length of the forewings is 7.1-7.8 mm for males and 6.7–7 mm for females. The ground colour of the forewings is dull silvery-grey, faintly overscaled with red orange and copper orange. The hindwings are pale olive brown with faint brownish-grey reticulations (a net-like pattern). Adults have been recorded on wing in December and January.

References

Moths described in 1999
Euliini
Moths of South America
Taxa named by Józef Razowski
Endemic fauna of Chile